Karen Newman is a professional singer based in Detroit, Michigan and was the anthem singer of the Detroit Red Wings for more than 30 years.

Biography
Newman was raised in the Michigan towns of Rochester and Grand Blanc, and was a 1978 graduate of Grand Blanc High School. From there, she studied music at Oakland University. She is best known for being "the voice" of the National Hockey League's Detroit Red Wings, regularly performing the national anthem before the team's home games, dating back to when they played at Joe Louis Arena. She has been uniquely known as "The Red Wings' Own". She has toured with Bob Seger and Kid Rock.

Newman has released five CDs, including the patriotic EP How Far We've Come, which includes the American and Canadian national anthems. Her single "Christmas Eve on Woodward Avenue" has become a traditional favorite for many Detroit radio stations, and has been included for many years as part of the Detroit Thanksgiving Parade.

Newman is also known for her annual Christmas concerts, which began with the regional hit "Christmas Eve on Woodward Avenue", a tribute to her hometown Detroit.

She has done numerous television commercials for local and national companies, and has served as celebrity spokesperson for John Bowman Chevrolet, Evola Music, Discount Tire Company, Sargent Appliance, Hanson Windows, Diabetes Care Education Association, and St. John Providence Health Systems' "Because We Care" campaign. She works with and supports numerous local children's and animal charities in and around Michigan.

Newman and her family live in a suburb of Detroit.

References

External links
 
Karen Newman's official website

Detroit Red Wings personnel
Oakland University alumni
People from Rochester, Michigan
Singers from Michigan
Living people
People from Grand Blanc, Michigan
Year of birth missing (living people)